The third set of elections to Kesteven County Council were held in March 1898. Kesteven was one of three divisions of the historic county of Lincolnshire in England; it consisted of the ancient wapentakes (or hundreds) of Aswardhurn, Aveland, Beltisloe, Boothby Graffoe, Flaxwell, Langoe, Loveden, Ness, and Winnibriggs and Threo. The Local Government Act 1888 established Kesteven as an administrative county, governed by a Council; elections were held every three years from 1889, until it was abolished by the Local Government Act 1972, which established Lincolnshire County Council in its place.

Forty-eight electoral divisions of the new Council were outlined in December 1888. Nearly every candidate was returned unopposed, with contests in only three divisions.

Results by division

Ancaster

Barrowby

Bassingham

Bennington

Billingborough

Billinghay

Bourne

Bracebridge

Branston

Bytham

Caythorpe

Claypole

Colsterworth

Corby

Deeping

Grantham no. 1

Grantham no. 2

Grantham no. 3

Grantham no. 4

Grantham no. 5

Grantham no. 6

Grantham no. 7

Great Gonerby

Heckington

Heighington

Helpringham

Kyme

Martin

Metheringham

Morton

Navenby

Osbournby

Ponton

Rippingale

Ropsley

Ruskington

Skellingthorpe

Sleaford East

Sleaford West

Stamford All Saints

Stamford St George's

Stamford St Michael's and St John's

Stamford St Martin's and St Mary's

Thurlby

Uffington

Waddington

Wellingore

Wilsford

References

Notes

Citations

1898
Kesteven County Council election
19th century in Lincolnshire